Lamprochernes chyzeri, also known as Chyzer’s shining claw, is a species of pseudoscorpion in the family Chernetidae. Its range covers most of Europe, including Sweden, Finland, Norway, England, Hungary, Romania and Yugoslavia. It is a phoretic passenger of the housefly.

References

Chernetidae